Bama or BAMA may refer to:

Places
 Bama, shortened form of Alabama, a state of the United States of America
 The University of Alabama, the public university serving the state, often known as simply Bama
 Bama, one of the colloquial Burmese names of Myanmar
 Bama, Borno, Nigeria, a Local Government Area of Borno State
 Bama, Burkina Faso, a town in Banwa Province, Burkina Faso
 Bama Department, Houet Province, Burkina Faso
 Bama, New South Wales, a parish in Cadell County in New South Wales, Australia
 Bama Yao Autonomous County, Guangxi, China
 Bama Town, Guangxi, seat of Bama County
 Boston-Atlanta Metropolitan Axis, colloquially known as "The Sprawl", a fictional near-future urban agglomeration in William Gibson's Sprawl trilogy

People
 Bama (writer) (born 1958), Indian Tamil author
 James Bama (born 1926), American artist
 Momodu Bama (died 2013), Nigerian member of Boko Haram
 Bama Rowell (1916–1993), American baseball player

Other uses
 Bama (band), an American pop group
 Bama (soil), the official state soil of Alabama
 Bama Gruppen, Norwegian food wholesaler
 British Aerosol Manufacturers' Association
 Bundesarchiv-Militärarchiv, abbreviated BAMA
 Bama (fly), a signal fly, described by David McAlpine, 2001, in the family Platystomatidae (Diptera)
 BAMA (organization), Black Archives of Mid-America